Jack Butel (born 19 March 1996 in St Saviour, Jersey) is a British racing driver from Jersey currently competing in the British Touring Car Championship, driving for Bristol Street Motors with EXCELR8 TradePriceCars.com. He debuted in 2020 after previously competing in the British GT Championship and F4 British Championship.

Racing record

Racing career summary

Complete British GT Championship results
(key) (Races in bold indicate pole position) (Races in italics indicate fastest lap)

Complete British Touring Car Championship results
(key) (Races in bold indicate pole position – 1 point awarded just in first race) (Races in italics indicate fastest lap – 1 point awarded all races) (* signifies that driver lead race for at least one lap – 1 point given all races)

References

External links

1996 births
Living people
British Touring Car Championship drivers
British GT Championship drivers
English racing drivers
British racing drivers
24H Series drivers
British F4 Championship drivers
JHR Developments drivers